Achaea argilla, the plain looper, is a moth of the family Erebidae first described by Charles Swinhoe in 1901. It is found in the northern half of Australia, especially in drier inland locations.

The wingspan is about 50 mm. The forewings have a subtle brown pattern. The hindwings are black with three white spots along the margin and an inner unbroken white band.

The larvae feed on Breynia oblongifolia and Euphorbia species. The larvae are initially blue-grey with black spiracles, and a grey and white head. There are raised black and white markings on the second and last abdominal segments. Later instar larvae are reddish brown with a black and white head, with a pair of red knobs on the tail, and a black mark on the back of the second abdominal segment. The spiracles on each side of the abdominal segments are orange with a black mark above each one. The first pair of prolegs is degenerate, forcing the larvae to move in a looper fashion.

Pupation takes place in a cocoon. The pupae are initially dark brown but soon become white.

External links

 Australian Faunal Directory
 

Moths of Australia
Achaea (moth)
Moths described in 1901